The 2012–13 Icelandic Hockey League season was the 22nd season of the Icelandic Hockey League, the top level of ice hockey in Iceland. Six teams participated in the league, and SA Vikingar won the championship.

Regular season

Final 
 SA Vikingar - Ísknattleiksfélagið Björninn 3:2 (3:4, 8:4, 5:4 SO, 3:4, 4:0)

External links 
 Season on eurohockey.com

Ice
Icelandic Hockey League seasons
2012–13 in Icelandic ice hockey